Makaryevsky Uyezd (Макарьевский уезд) was one of the subdivisions of the Nizhny Novgorod Governorate of the Russian Empire. It was situated in the northeastern part of the governorate. Its administrative centre was Makaryevo.

Demographics
At the time of the Russian Empire Census of 1897, Makaryevsky Uyezd had a population of 108,994. Of these, 98.5% spoke Russian, 1.2% Mari and 0.1% Tatar as their native language.

References

 
Uezds of Nizhny Novgorod Governorate
Nizhny Novgorod Governorate